Sumy Oblast, also known as Sumshchyna, is an oblast (province) in northeast Ukraine. The oblast was created in its most recent form, from the merging of raions from  Kharkiv Oblast, Chernihiv Oblast, and Poltava Oblast in 1939 by the Presidium of the Supreme Soviet of the Soviet Union.

The estimated population is 

The administrative center of the oblast is the city of Sumy. Other  important cities within the oblast include Konotop, Okhtyrka, Romny, and Shostka. Importantly, seven rivers pass through the oblast.

Geography

The Sumy Oblast is situated in the northeastern part of Ukraine. It is situated on a border of two historical regions of Ukraine — Cossack Hetmanate (annexed by Russia in the 18th century as Little Russia, previously known as Severia) and Sloboda Ukraine. Elevation is 110–240m above sea level.
The area of the oblast (23,800 km2), comprises about 3.95% of the total area of the country.

The oblast borders Bryansk Oblast (Russia) on the northeast, Belgorod Oblast and Kursk Oblast (Russia) on the east, Poltava Oblast on the southwest, Kharkiv Oblast on the south, and the Chernihiv Oblast on the west.

Seven main rivers flow through the oblast, with the Desna River the largest.

History
The region was created on the ukase of Presidium of the Supreme Soviet of the Soviet Union on 10 January 1939 as part of the Ukrainian Soviet Socialist Republic. The newly created Sumy Oblast included 12 former raions of Kharkiv Oblast, 17 former raions of Chernihiv Oblast, and 2 former raions of Poltava Oblast.

During World War II in 1941–43, it was occupied by Nazi Germany under administration of the German Wehrmacht. After the German forces were driven out, the Soviet Union regained control of the region under jurisdiction of the Ukrainian Soviet Socialist Republic.

In 1965 one of former Chernihiv Oblast raions (Talalaivka Raion) was returned to Chernihiv Oblast.

During the 2022 invasion of Ukraine the Sumy Oblast was one of the first regions where Russian and Ukrainian forces clashed. Parts of the oblast came under Russian occupation during the invasion. On 4 April 2022 Governor of Sumy Oblast Dmytro Zhyvytskyi stated that Russian troops no longer occupied any towns or villages in Sumy Oblast and had mostly withdrawn, while Ukrainian troops were working to push out the remaining units. On 8 April 2022 Zhyvytskyi stated that all Russian troops had left Sumy Oblast.

Points of interest
The following historic-cultural sited were nominated for the Seven Wonders of Ukraine.
 Monument to mamonth (Kulishivka)
 Kruhliy dvir (Round court)
 Sofroniiv monastery

Administrative divisions

It comprises 18 raions (districts), 15 cities, 7 city municipalities, 20 urban-type settlements, 384 village councils, and 1500 villages.

The following data incorporates the number of each type of administrative divisions of the Sumy Oblast:

 Administrative Center – 1 (Sumy)
 Raions – 18;
 City raions – 2;
 Settlements – 1526, including:
 Villages – 1491;
 Cities/Towns – 35, including:
 Urban-type settlement – 20;
 Cities – 15, including:
 Cities of oblast subordinance – 7;
 Cities of raion subordinance – 8;
 Selsovets – 384.

The local administration of the oblast is controlled by the Sumy Oblast council. The governor of the oblast (chairman of state regional administration) is appointed by the President of Ukraine.

Note: Asterisks (*) Though the administrative center of the rayon is housed in the city/town that it is named after, cities do not answer to the rayon authorities only towns do; instead they are directly subordinated to the oblast government and therefore are not counted as part of rayon statistics.

Age structure
 0-14 years: 12.7%  (male 74,529/female 70,521)
 15-64 years: 70.8%  (male 386,250/female 422,077)
 65 years and over: 16.5%  (male 60,374/female 127,306) (2013 official)

Median age
 total: 42.0 years 
 male: 38.6 years 
 female: 45.4 years  (2013 official)

Environment
The Sumy Oblast contains 168 objects and territories of natural reserve. The oblast is rich in picturesque banks of numerous rivers, and sources of mineral waters. 
Major environmental problems are: soil erosion, pesticide pollution, air and water pollution. The city has a problem of garbage utilization.
The only place for pesticide utilization in Ukraine is Shostka, Sumy region.

Economy

Industry

The main industrial activities of the oblast are: chemical mechanical engineering, pumping and energy mechanical engineering, agricultural machine-construction, instrument-making industry and radio electronics, technical equipment production for processing fields of agro-industrial complexes, mining and iron ore production industry, polygraph industry and medicine production, oil and gas processing, chemical production, film and photo material production (See: Svema), and chemical fertilizer production. In general, there are 273 large industry enterprises and 327 small industry enterprises.

Agriculture

In 1999, the gross grain yield was about 446,000 tons, sugar beets – 664,000 tons, sunflower seeds – 27,700 tons, potatoes – 343,600 tons. The region also produced 108,700 tons of meat, 517,800 tons of milk and 295,300,000 eggs. At the beginning of 1999, there were 781 registered farms in the oblast.

Notable people from Sumy Oblast
 Viktor Yushchenko – 3rd President of Ukraine (2005–2010); Khoruzhivka village
 Yevhen Adamtsevych – a Ukrainian bandurist, the author of Zaporizhian March
 Oleksi Berest – one of the soldiers who hoisted the Victory Banner in Berlin and a posthumous Hero of Ukraine.
 Dmitry Chechulin – architect; born Shostka 1901
 Thomas de Hartmann, composer
 Oleh Husyev – Ukrainian internal footballer
 Ivan Nikitovich Kozhedub – WW2 ace and air marshal of the Soviet Union.
 Natalia Ivanovna Sedova – Wife of Leon Trotsky, born Romny 1882
 Stephen Timoshenko – the father of modern engineering mechanics (1878-1972)
 Leonid Toptunov – senior reactor control chief engineer at the Chernobyl Nuclear Power Plant Reactor Unit 4 on the night of the Chernobyl disaster

Nomenclature

Most of Ukraine's oblasts are named after their capital cities, officially referred to as "oblast centers" (translit. oblasnyi tsentr). The name of each oblast is a relative adjective, formed by adding a feminine suffix to the name of respective center city: Sumy is the center of the Sums’ka oblast (Sumy Oblast). Most oblasts are also sometimes referred to in a feminine noun form, following the convention of traditional regional place names, ending with the suffix "-shchyna", as is the case with the Sumy Oblast, Sumshchyna.

See also
 Subdivisions of Ukraine
 Russian occupation of Sumy Oblast

References

External links 
 State Administration of Sumy Oblast – official site  
 Information Card of the Region – official site of the Cabinet of Ministers of Ukraine
 Independent regional Web-portal – news, features, entertainment & tourism info 

 
Oblasts of Ukraine
States and territories established in 1939
1939 establishments in Ukraine